Matthias Schwab (born 9 December 1994) is an Austrian professional golfer who plays on the European Tour and the PGA Tour. As a 17 year old, he finished runner-up at the 2012 Amateur Championship. On the 2019 European Tour, he finished 17th on the Race to Dubai rankings after 10 top-10 finishes, including two second place finishes.

Amateur career
Schwab had a successful amateur career. He reached the final of the 2012 Amateur Championship at Royal Troon Golf Club, losing to Alan Dunbar by 1 hole. He attended Vanderbilt University from 2013 to 2017. While at Vanderbilt he was joint third in the individual competition in both the 2016 and 2017 NCAA Division I Men's Golf Championships.

Professional career
Schwab turned professional in June  2017 and played on the Challenge Tour for the rest of the year, finishing 33rd in the Order of Merit. In November 2017 Schwab became one of 33 players to earn 2018 European Tour cards through Q School.

Schwab played on the European Tour during 2018. In March, he tied for fourth place in the Hero Indian Open and ended his rookie year, 72nd on the Race to Dubai with seven top-10 finishes. On the 2019 European Tour, he finished second at the Porsche European Open, tied fourth at the Italian Open and lost in a playoff at the Turkish Airlines Open event to end 17th in the 2019 Race to Dubai rankings and moved to 80th on the Official World Golf Ranking. On 3 November 2019, at the WGC-HSBC Champions at the Sheshan International GC, Shanghai, China, he finished tied fourth, four strokes behind winner Rory McIlroy.

Schwab competed in the Men's individual event at the 2020 Summer Olympics, finishing tied-27th overall.

Personal life
Schwab's father Andreas represented Austria in the bobsleigh event at the 1976 Winter Olympics.

Amateur wins
2010 Austrian Amateur, Italian Under 16 Championship
2012 Slovenian International Amateur
2015 Mason Rudolph Championship, Swiss International Championship

Source:

Playoff record
European Tour playoff record (0–1)

Results in major championships
Results not in chronological order in 2020.

CUT = missed the half-way cut

NT = No tournament due to COVID-19 pandemic

Results in The Players Championship

"T" indicates a tie for a place

Results in World Golf Championships

1Cancelled due to COVID-19 pandemic

NT = No tournament
"T" = Tied

Team appearances
Amateur
European Boys' Team Championship (representing Austria): 2010, 2011, 2012
Jacques Léglise Trophy (representing the Continent of Europe): 2012
Junior Ryder Cup (representing Europe): 2012
European Amateur Team Championship (representing Austria): 2013, 2016
Arnold Palmer Cup (representing Europe): 2015, 2016 (winners)
St Andrews Trophy (representing the Continent of Europe): 2016
Eisenhower Trophy (representing Austria): 2016

Source:

See also
2017 European Tour Qualifying School graduates
2021 Korn Ferry Tour Finals graduates

References

External links
 
 
 
 

Austrian male golfers
European Tour golfers
PGA Tour golfers
Olympic golfers of Austria
Golfers at the 2020 Summer Olympics
Vanderbilt Commodores men's golfers
People from Liezen District
Sportspeople from Styria
1994 births
Living people